Fresnillo plc is a Mexican precious metals mining company incorporated in the United Kingdom and headquartered in Mexico City.  Fresnillo is the world's largest producer of silver from ore (primary silver) and Mexico's second-largest gold miner. It is listed on the London Stock Exchange and is a constituent of the FTSE 100 Index.

History
Formerly a wholly owned operating division of Industrias Peñoles, a minority stake in the company was spun off on the London Stock Exchange in a May 2008 IPO, with a secondary listing on the Mexican Stock Exchange on the same day.

On 15 August 2012, Octavio Alvídrez took over as chief executive from Jaime Lomelín, following a handover period.

Operations
The company operates three gold and silver mines in Mexico (Industrias Peñoles retained the rights to its primary base metals mines when Fresnillo was spun off). The largest mine, in terms of silver output, is Mina Proaño (also known as Fresnillo Mine), located near the city of Fresnillo in the state of Zacatecas; the other mines are at Cienega, in Durango, and Herradura, in Sonora. In 2007, Fresnillo plc produced 34.3 million ounces of silver and 279,614 ounces of gold from its three active mines, as well as around 20 tons each of zinc and lead as by-products.

The company also has 21 active exploration projects located across the country. It signalled plans to use the money raised in its IPO to expand into Peru and Chile.

Carbon footprint
Fresnillo reported Total CO2e emissions (Direct + Indirect) for 31 December 2020 at 842 Kt (-7 /-0.8% y-o-y).

References

External links

Google Finance profile

Non-renewable resource companies established in 2008
Companies based in Mexico City
Silver mining companies of Mexico
Gold mining companies of Mexico
Companies listed on the London Stock Exchange
2008 establishments in Mexico